C. William Haines (November 2, 1928 – December 18, 1996) was an American Republican Party politician who served in the New Jersey General Assembly from the 8th Legislative District from 1982 to 1985 and in the New Jersey Senate from 1985 until his death in 1996.

He died of cancer on December 18, 1996, in Mount Laurel, New Jersey at age 68.

References

1928 births
1996 deaths
Republican Party members of the New Jersey General Assembly
Republican Party New Jersey state senators
People from Mount Laurel, New Jersey
Politicians from Burlington County, New Jersey
Deaths from cancer in New Jersey
University of Massachusetts Amherst alumni
20th-century American politicians